David J. Stewart (January 8, 1915 – December 23, 1966) was an American Broadway, film, and television actor.

Born Abe J. Siegel in Omaha, Nebraska, Stewart was known primarily as a New York stage actor. However, he also made several appearances in movies and on television before his death at age 51 in Cleveland, Ohio, following surgery.

Early life
Stewart was born in Omaha and attended the University of Omaha.  He moved to New York and trained as an actor at the
Neighborhood Playhouse School of the Theater and the Actors Studio.  During World War II he served as a paratrooper in the 82nd Airborne, receiving a Purple Heart and a Bronze Star.

Film and TV Career
Stewart's played Louis "Lepke" Buchalter, the real-life crime boss whose activities were central to the film Murder, Inc. (1960). He also co-starred in the rockabilly-themed film Carnival Rock (1957), for which director Roger Corman, hoping to give the film some gravitas, recruited him from New York, a point noted by actor Ed Nelson in an interview with film historian Tom Weaver.

Stewart's strong, aquiline features were well-suited to the stage but limited his on-screen roles to character parts. This may have frustrated the actor. According to Nelson, Stewart looked at him on the set one day and remarked, "My God, what I couldn't do with a face like that."

His other film roles were small, and, while he appeared often on live television in the 1950s, his only TV roles that remain accessible were on Have Gun Will Travel, One Step Beyond, Alfred Hitchcock Presents, Voyage to the Bottom of the Sea, The Man From U.N.C.L.E., The Untouchables and Naked City.

The Hitchcock episode "The Sorcerer's Apprentice" concerns a magician (played by Stewart) whose act includes sawing his wife in half. The episode was deemed too gruesome by the NBC Television Network and sponsor Revlon, which cancelled the network broadcast. The episode was later syndicated to local stations. An infamous footnote in the series' history, the episode fell into public domain, and is often included in value-priced Hitchcock DVD collections.

Broadway career
Stewart's Broadway career was more illustrious; in a cast composed primarily of his fellow Actors Studio members, and directed by Studio co-founder Elia Kazan, Stewart played Proust's Baron de Charlus in the original 1953 production of Tennessee Williams' Camino Real. Though the play was a notorious flop, Stewart won the Clarence Derwent Award for most-promising male performer from the Actors' Equity Foundation. He also appeared in the 1962 Broadway premiere of A Man For All Seasons and the original 1964 productions of Arthur Miller's After the Fall and Incident at Vichy.

Death
Stewart died after an operation in Cleveland, Ohio on December 23, 1966.  He was survived by his wife, Helene, a son, Jean-Pierre, a daughter, Judy and four sisters.  His funeral was held on December 26 in Omaha.

Filmography

Citations

References
 Tom Weaver, Double Feature Creature Attack (McFarland & Company, 2002)

External links

David Stewart at the University of Wisconsin's Actors Studio audio collection

1915 births
1966 deaths
Male actors from Omaha, Nebraska
20th-century American male actors
American male film actors
American male stage actors
American male television actors